ncdu (NCurses Disk Usage) is a disk utility for Unix systems. Its name refers to its similar purpose to the du utility, but ncdu uses a text-based user interface under the [n]curses programming library. Users can navigate the list using the arrow keys and delete files that are taking up too much space by pressing the 'd' key. Version 1.09 and later can export the file listing in JSON format.

ncdu was developed by Yoran Heling to learn C and to serve as a disk usage analyzer on remote systems over ssh. Version 2.0 of the program brought a full rewrite in the Zig programming language.

References

External links

 git repository for ncdu

Disk usage analysis software
Software using the MIT license
Free software programmed in C
2007 software
 
Unix file system-related software
Software that uses ncurses